Pyla is a village in Larnaca District, Cyprus. It is one of only four villages located within the United Nations Buffer Zone, the other three being Athienou, Troulloi and Deneia. Pyla is located in the eastern part of the island, adjacent to the British Sovereign Base Area of Dhekelia. From a legal point of view, it is administered as all other areas controlled by the government of the Republic of Cyprus, but policed by UN peacekeepers.

The village is special in the respect that it is the only settlement in Cyprus still inhabited by both its original Greek Cypriot and Turkish Cypriot inhabitants. 850 of the inhabitants are Greek Cypriots and 487 are Turkish Cypriots. The village has three churches and one mosque.

Pyla-Kokkinokremos  is an archaeological site dating to the Late Bronze Age.

History

Pyla is among the oldest villages in Cyprus. The village was first inhabited during the Middle Ages.  
On several old maps it is marked with the names Pila or Pilla.

The name of the village is Greek which leads to the assumption that the village existed during the Byzantine years. The name "Pyla" is after the Greek word "πύλη" (entrance), probably because it was the only way to travel to the plain of Mesaoria. The University of Central Lancashire has a campus in the village, the only British university to have a site on the island.

Pyla Tourist Area
Pyla Tourist Area is the area that neighbours the sea and belongs to the administrative division of the village of Pyla.

Several of the most luxurious hotels in Cyprus are located in the tourist area of Pyla, such as: Golden Bay, Lordos Beach and Sandy Beach. This strip is lined with a mix of taverns and restaurants, as well as tourist shops and boutiques, which all run parallel to the beachside which offers organised facilities, as well as kiosks and ice-cream stands. Pyla Tourist Area continues through the new Larnaca-Dhekelia sea road, onwards to the C.T.O. (Cyprus Tourist Organisation) beach.

Sports
Currently, Aspis FC is the only football club in the village of Pyla.
Also, the village hosts a volleyball club, named Finikas.

People from Pyla
Anna Vissi

References

Communities in Larnaca District